1873 Agenor  is a dark Jupiter trojan from the Trojan camp, approximately  in diameter. It was discovered during the Palomar–Leiden Trojan survey in 1971, and later named after Agenor from Greek mythology. The dark Jovian asteroid belongs to the 100 largest Jupiter trojans and has a rotation period of 20.60 hours.

Discovery 

Agenor was discovered on 25 March 1971, by Dutch astronomer couple Ingrid and Cornelis van Houten at Leiden, on photographic plates taken by Dutch–American astronomer Tom Gehrels at Palomar Observatory in the Palomar Mountain Range, southeast of Los Angeles.

Palomar–Leiden survey 

The discovery was made in a survey of faint Trojans, one night after the discovery of 1870 Glaukos. The trio of Dutch and Dutch–American astronomers also collaborated on the productive Palomar–Leiden survey in the 1960s, using the same procedure as for this (smaller) survey: Tom Gehrels used Palomar's Samuel Oschin telescope (also known as the 48-inch Schmidt Telescope), and shipped the photographic plates to Cornelis and Ingrid van Houten at Leiden Observatory where astrometry was carried out.

Orbit and classification 

Agenor is a dark Jovian asteroid in a 1:1 orbital resonance with Jupiter. It is located in the trailering Trojan camp at the Gas Giant's  Lagrangian point, 60° behind its orbit . It is also a non-family asteroid of the Jovian background population. It orbits the Sun at a distance of 4.7–5.7 AU once every 11 years and 12 months (4,370 days; semi-major axis of 5.23 AU). Its orbit has an eccentricity of 0.09 and an inclination of 22° with respect to the ecliptic. The body's observation arc begins with its official discovery observation at Palomar in March 1971.

Physical characteristics 

Agenor is an assumed, carbonaceous C-type asteroid.

Rotation period 

Diameter and albedo 

According to the surveys carried out by the Japanese Akari satellite and the NEOWISE mission of NASA's Wide-field Infrared Survey Explorer, Agenor measures between 50.80 and 54.38 kilometers in diameter and its surface has an albedo between 0.038 and 0.062. The Collaborative Asteroid Lightcurve Link derives an albedo of 0.0506 and a diameter of 53.89 kilometers based on an absolute magnitude of 10.2.

Naming 

This minor planet was named for Agenor, who was able to inflict a wound on the Greek warrior Achilles. The Olympian deity Apollo assumed Agenor's form to distract Achilles while the Trojans forces were retreating. The minor planets 588 Achilles and 1862 Apollo are named after these two figures from Greek mythology. The body's name was suggested by Brian G. Marsden, the then director of the MPC. The official  was published by the Minor Planet Center on 1 June 1975.

References

External links 
 Asteroid Lightcurve Database (LCDB), query form (info )
 Dictionary of Minor Planet Names, Google books
 Asteroid 1873 Agenor at the Small Bodies Data Ferret
 
 

001873
Discoveries by Cornelis Johannes van Houten
Discoveries by Ingrid van Houten-Groeneveld
Discoveries by Tom Gehrels
Named minor planets
19710325